Battaglini is an Italian surname. Notable people with the surname include:

Francesco Battaglini (1823–1892), Italian cardinal
Giuseppe Battaglini (1826–1894), Italian mathematician
Marco Battaglini (1645–1717), Italian jurist and priest

See also
8155 Battaglini, a main-belt asteroid

Italian-language surnames